Visitors to Zambia must obtain a visa from one of the Zambian diplomatic missions unless they come from one of the visa exempt countries or countries whose citizens are eligible for visa on arrival. Visitors may alternatively obtain an electronic visa. All visitors must hold a passport valid for at least 6 months. As of November 2014 Zambia and Zimbabwe also offer a universal visa.

Visa policy map

Visa exemption countries
Holders of passports issued by the following 83 countries and territories do not need a visa to enter Zambia for up to 90 days in one year as tourists or 30 days in one year for business:

In addition, visa exemption applies to holders of passports issued to residents of the following jurisdictions:

Visa on arrival
Nationals of following 61 countries and territories may obtain a visa for Zambia on arrival for up to 90 days as tourists or 30 days for business:

Holders of diplomatic or official passports of any countries may obtain visa on arrival.

e-Visa
Zambia introduced an e-Visa system in late 2014. It is an alternative to visas issued at Zambian missions abroad or on arrival. Visa holder can stay in Zambia for the period of 90 days during a given calendar year since the date of entry into Zambia. For nationals that may obtain visas at ports of entry, the e-Visa takes 3 working days to process and for nationals that require visas prior to travel to Zambia processing time takes a minimum of 5 working days.

Universal visa

Zambia and Zimbabwe introduced a universal visa on 28 November 2014 called KAZA Visa. This visa can be obtained on arrival and is valid for both countries for visits up to 30 days while remaining within Zambia and Zimbabwe (including day trips to Chobe National Park in Botswana at Kazungula). In second phase Namibia, Angola and Botswana are expected to join the project. In third stage three SADC pilot countries are expected to join and in fourth stage all SADC countries are expected to become part of the universal visa project.

The universal visa project was suspended in 2015 due to running out of visa stickers and the expiry of the Memorandum of Understanding between the two countries. The new Memorandum was signed in December 2016, extending the list of eligible countries (including territories) from 40 to 65. In Zambia it is issued at Livingstone Airport, Victoria Falls, Kazungula and Lusaka Airport border crossings.

Eligible countries are:

Visitor statistics
Most visitors arriving to Zambia were from the following countries of nationality:

See also

Visa requirements for Zambian citizens
List of diplomatic missions of Zambia

Sources
 Nationals who do not require a visa,  Department of Immigration
  Nationals requiring visas on arrival or at missions abroad,  Department of Immigration
 Nationals requiring visas prior to travel,  Department of Immigration
 e-Visa

References

Foreign relations of Zambia
Tourism in Zambia
Zambia